Sonargaon is an upazila of Narayanganj District in the Division of Dhaka, Bangladesh.

Demographics
As of the 1991 Bangladeshi census, Sonargaon has a population of 261,881 in 44,405 households. Males constitute 52.11% of the population, and females 47.89%. The population over 18 years of age is 118,319.

Sonargaon has an average literacy rate of 33.1% (7+ years), compared with the national average of 32.4%.

Food
Local food includes Gurer Zilapi, Murali, Binni Khoi, Shwandesh, etc.

Administration
Sonargaon Upazila is divided into Sonargaon Municipality and ten union parishads: Baidyerbazar, Baradi, Jampur, Kachpur, Mugrapara, Naogaon, Pirijpur, Sadipur, Shambhupura, and Shanmandi. The union parishads are subdivided into 351 mauzas and 487 villages.

Sonargaon Municipality is subdivided into 9 wards and 60 mahallas.

See also
Sonargaon
Upazilas of Bangladesh
Districts of Bangladesh
Divisions of Bangladesh

References

 
Upazilas of Narayanganj District